Aaron Latham (October 3, 1943 – July 23, 2022) was an American journalist and screenwriter who was known for the films Urban Cowboy (1980), Perfect (1985), and The Program (1993).

Biography
Latham was born on October 3, 1943, in Spur, Texas. He was raised in a Methodist family, the son of Annie Launa (Cozby) and Cecil Clyde Latham. Latham attended Amherst College, where he studied literature and served as an editor on the Amherst Student, the college newspaper, graduating in 1966.

Career 
He was a regular contributor to such publications as Rolling Stone, Esquire, Talk, and The New York Times. He wrote the article that inspired the 1980 movie Urban Cowboy and co-wrote its script with director James Bridges. He also co-wrote the book for the short-lived 2003 Broadway musical version. He also wrote novels and co-wrote the screenplays Perfect, also with Bridges, another film inspired by his articles, and The Program.

Personal life
Latham married CBS News and 60 Minutes correspondent Lesley Stahl in 1977. Their daughter is named Taylor. He died of complications from Parkinson’s disease on July 23, 2022, at the age of 78.

References

External links
Production: Urban Cowboy Working in the Theatre Seminar video at American Theatre Wing.org, April 2003

1943 births
2022 deaths
American male screenwriters
American musical theatre librettists
People from Spur, Texas
American male dramatists and playwrights
Place of birth missing
American dramatists and playwrights
Journalists from Texas
20th-century American journalists
American male journalists
American male non-fiction writers
Screenwriters from Texas